Dominika Šalková (born 28 June 2004) is a Czech tennis player.

Šalková has a career high WTA singles ranking of 424 achieved on 18 July 2022. She also has a career high WTA doubles ranking of 569 achieved on 18 July 2022.

Šalková made her WTA main draw debut at the 2022 Prague Open after qualifying for the singles main draw, defeating Astra Sharma and Natalia Vikhlyantseva in qualifying. She also received a wildcard for the doubles main draw with Barbora Palicová.

Junior career 
Junior Grand Slam results - Singles:

 Australian Open: 3R (2022)
 French Open: 3R (2022)
 Wimbledon: 1R (2022)
 US Open: –

Junior Grand Slam results - Doubles:

 Australian Open: 2R (2022)
 French Open: 2R (2022)
 Wimbledon: QF (2022)
 US Open: –

Performance timelines 

Only main-draw results in WTA Tour, Grand Slam tournaments, Fed Cup/Billie Jean King Cup and Olympic Games are included in win–loss records.

Singles 
Current after the 2023 Australian Open.

Doubles 
Current after the 2023 Australian Open.

ITF Circuit finals

Singles: 1 (1 title)

Doubles: 5 (3 titles, 2 runner-ups)

Junior finals

ITF Finals

Singles: 8 (4 titles, 4 runner-ups)

Doubles: 9 (5 titles, 4 runner-ups)

Notes

References

External links

2004 births
Living people
Czech female tennis players
21st-century Czech women